Frederick of Brandenburg (December 12, 1530 in Berlin – October 2, 1552 in Halberstadt) was Prince-Archbishop of Magdeburg and Administrator of the Prince-Bishopric of Halberstadt.

Life 
Frederick was the son of the Elector of Brandenburg, Joachim II (1505–1571), from his first marriage to Magdalena of Saxony (1507–1534), daughter of George, Duke of Saxony.

After the deposition of Archbishop Johann Albrecht von Brandenburg-Ansbach-Kulmbach after the Schmalkaldic War, Frederick was appointed as new Archbishop to prevent the annexation of Magdeburg by Saxony. His appointment was confirmed by the Pope in 1551. Frederick died the next year. His splendid household had cost 20.000 Guilders in the 25 weeks he ruled.

First, his death was kept secret, which strengthened the rumors he had been poisoned.
He was succeeded by his half-brother Sigismund of Brandenburg.

16th-century German Roman Catholic bishops
Archbishops of Magdeburg
House of Hohenzollern
1530 births
1552 deaths
Lutheran administrators of Havelberg Prince-Bishopric
Sons of monarchs